Industry is a town in Austin County, Texas, United States, at the junction of State Highway 159 (SH 159) and Farm to Market Road 109 (FM 109). The population was 268 at the 2020 census. Industry was the first permanent German settlement in Texas. Friedrich Ernst, Industry's founder, settled here in 1831 and gained Industry the title "Cradle of German Settlement in Texas" (see German Texan).

The community was so named on account of the industrious character of the first settlers.

Geography

Industry is located at  (29.967368, –96.497089) at the intersection of east-west running SH 159 and FM 109 which goes north and south. West End Elementary School is within the city limits.

Demographics

As of the 2020 United States census, there were 268 people, 119 households, and 94 families residing in the city.

As of the census of 2000, there were 304 persons, 142 households, and 84 families residing in the city. The population density was 291.0 people per square mile (112.9/km2). There were 142 housing units at an average density of 135.9 per square mile (52.7/km2). The racial makeup of the city was 69.41% White, 19.74% African American, 9.21% from other races, and 1.64% from two or more races. Hispanic or Latino of any race were 10.53% of the population.

There were 119 households, out of which 32.8% had children under the age of 18 living with them, 56.3% were married couples living together, 9.2% had a female householder with no husband present, and 29.4% were non-families. 26.9% of all households were made up of individuals, and 16.0% had someone living alone who was 65 years of age or older. The average household size was 2.55 and the average family size was 3.11.

In the city, the population was spread out, with 26.0% under the age of 18, 9.5% from 18 to 24, 23.7% from 25 to 44, 24.0% from 45 to 64, and 16.8% who were 65 years of age or older. The median age was 38 years. For every 100 females, there were 101.3 males. For every 100 females age 18 and over, there were 94.0 males.

The median income for a household in the city was $30,625, and the median income for a family was $38,750. Males had a median income of $25,500 versus $23,542 for females. The per capita income for the city was $13,294. About 15.8% of families and 22.4% of the population were below the poverty line, including 31.6% of those under the age of eighteen and 28.6% of those 65 or over.

Education
Industry is within the Bellville Independent School District.

Industry students are zoned to West End Elementary School, Bellville Junior High School, and Bellville High School.

Notable people
Lucas Luetge, major league baseball player

References

External links

 Handbook of Texas Online article

Cities in Austin County, Texas
Cities in Texas
Greater Houston
German-American culture in Texas